was a Japanese actress and voice actress from Shibuya, Tokyo. She was best known for her roles in Sazae-san (as Hiroshi Nakajima), Doraemon (as Hidetoshi Dekisugi from 1980 to 2005) and Space Ace (as Ace).

On November 26, 2015, Shirakawa failed to attend a voice recording session for Sazae-San. Her body was discovered at her home by family members and Sazae-San staff members. She died of a subarachnoid hemorrhage at her home in Tokyo.
She was 80 years old.

Filmography

Television animation
1960s	
Himitsu no Akko-chan (1969) - Motoko "Moko" Naniwa
Jump Out! Batchiri (1966) - Batchiri
Kaitō Pride (1965) - Check	
Sazae-san (1969) - Hiroshi Nakajima	
Space Ace (1965) - Ace

1970s	
Andersen Stories (1971) - Chimney Sweep Chris, Peter, Carl
Dog of Flanders (TV series) (1975) - Andre
Doraemon (1979-2005) - Hidetoshi Dekisugi

1980s	
Astro Boy (1980) - Mitsuru, Pula	

 	
2010s	
Space Dandy (2014) - Hiroshi

References

External links 
 
 

1935 births
2015 deaths
Deaths from subarachnoid hemorrhage
Japanese video game actresses
Japanese voice actresses
People from Shibuya
Place of death missing
Voice actresses from Tokyo Metropolis